Events during the year 1954 in Northern Ireland.

Incumbents
 Governor - 	The Lord Wakehurst 
 Prime Minister - Basil Brooke

Events
 6 April – Flags and Emblems (Display) Act (Northern Ireland) is introduced, making it illegal to interfere with the display of a Union Flag and giving the Royal Ulster Constabulary the right to remove any other flag or emblem if it is thought that it might lead to a breach of peace.
 12 June – An Irish Republican Army unit carries out a successful arms raid on Gough Barracks in Armagh signalling the renewal of IRA activity following a long hiatus.
 17 August – Ocean liner SS Southern Cross is launched by Harland and Wolff in Belfast.
 The Republican political party Fianna Uladh is formed by Liam Kelly as the political wing of Saor Uladh.
 Roselawn Cemetery opens in Belfast.

Arts and literature
John Hewitt's The Bloody Brae: A Dramatic Poem (1936) is first broadcast on the BBC Northern Ireland Home Service.

Sport

Football
Irish League
Winners: Linfield

Irish Cup
Winners: Derry City 2 – 2, 0 – 0, 1 – 0 Glentoran

Births
9 March – Bobby Sands, Provisional Irish Republican Army volunteer and MP (died on hunger strike 1981).
8 April – Joe Kernan, Gaelic footballer and manager.
28 April – Monica McWilliams, Northern Ireland Women's Coalition MLA, later Chief Commissioner of the Northern Ireland Human Rights Commission.
11 May – Jane Morrice, Northern Ireland Women's Coalition MLA.
23 May – Gerry Armstrong, footballer.
23 June – Michael Copeland, Unionist politician.
2 August – Sammy McIlroy, footballer and football manager.
28 August – Clive Culbertson, mystic, musician and healer.
12 October – Kieran Deeny, medical doctor turned independent politician and MLA.
19 October – Angela Feeney, opera singer.
Eamon Collins, Provisional Irish Republican Army activist and writer (died 1999).
Martin O'Brien, journalist.
Marian Price, Provisional Irish Republican Army volunteer.

Deaths
1 May – James Macmahon, civil servant and businessman, Under-Secretary for Ireland from 1918 to 1922 (born 1865).
11 October – Thomas Teevan, Unionist politician and lawyer (born 1927).

See also
1954 in Scotland
1954 in Wales

References